Płochocin may refer to the following places:
Płochocin, Kuyavian-Pomeranian Voivodeship (north-central Poland)
Płochocin, Masovian Voivodeship (east-central Poland)
Płochocin, West Pomeranian Voivodeship (north-west Poland)